Pasighat West is one of the 60 constituencies of the Arunachal Pradesh Legislative Assembly in India. East Siang is the name of the district that contains Tehsil Pasighat West. It is surrounded by Pangin Tehsil towards west, Bilat Tehsil towards south, Koyu Tehsil towards west. Tinsukia, Dibrugarh and Silapathar are the nearby cities to Pasighat.

Members of the Legislative Assembly

Election results

2019

See also
List of constituencies of Arunachal Pradesh Legislative Assembly
Arunachal Pradesh Legislative Assembly

References

Villages in East Siang district
Assembly constituencies of Arunachal Pradesh